Having a Party is a 1982 studio album from Swedish group Chips. It was released in May 1982. The album sold more than 100 000 copies in Sweden, both gold and platinum. Back in those days, the demands for selling gold and platinum were higher than as of today (2006). Gold was at least 50 000 and platinum was at least 100 000.

Track listing

Side A
"Having a Party" - 3.02
"Get Him out of Your Mind" - 3.20 (Elisabeth)
"Our Love is Over" - 4.18 - (Kikki)
"Day after Day" (Dag efter dag) - 2.54
"Someone Needs Somebodys Love" - 3.40 (Kikki)
"I Believe in You" - 4.40 (Elisabeth)

Side B
"Jealousy" - 3.52 (Elisabeth)
"Good Morning" (God morgon) - 3.00
"Bang Bang (He Shot 'em Down)" - 4.35 (Lasse Holm)
"Tokyo" - 3.00 (Instrumental)
"Nobodys Baby but Mine" - 3.10 (Kikki)
"Dag efter dag" - 2.54

Contributing musicians
Song: Kikki Danielsson, Elisabeth Andreasson, Lasse Holm
Bass: Rutger Gunnarsson, Mike Watson
drums: "Hulken", Per Lindvall
Piano: Lasse Holm
Saxophone: Hans Arktoft, Hector Bingert, Ulf Andersson
String arrangements: Rutger Gunnarsson, Anders Engberg
Guitar: Hasse Rosén, Lasse Wellander
Lead guitar: Lasse Holm

Lyrics and music
All text and lyrics by Lasse Holm and Torgny Söderberg expect:
"Dag efter dag"/"Day after Day": Lasse Holm and Monica Forsberg
"Good Morning": Lasse Holm and Monica Forsberg
"Tokyo": Lasse Holm

Charts

References

1982 albums
Chips (band) albums